Arkhangelskoye (Arxangel) is a rural locality (a selo) and the administrative center of Arkhangelsky District of the Republic of Bashkortostan, Russia. Population:

References

Notes

Sources

Rural localities in Arkhangelsky District
Ufa Governorate